Juan de Vergara (Toledo, Spain, 1492-1557) was a Spanish humanist, brother of another famous Spanish humanist, Francisco de Vergara. The brothers were of Jewish descent on the maternal side. He was one of the editors of the Complutensian Polyglot Bible.

References

1557 deaths
1492 births
Spanish Renaissance humanists